Star 67 is a 2012 crime thriller directed by Triden V Balasingam & Kathi Selvakumar, featuring Imman Kannan in the lead role. The soundtrack of the film was composed by Senthuran Alagaiya, while cinematography and editing were handled by Kuhenthiran and Triden V. Balasingam, respectively. It was produced by Wotar Sound Pictures. It had a decent run at select cinemas and tasted success at the box office.

Cast
 Imman Kannan
 Yasotha. M
 Hamalton Christy
 Kurungan Manimaran
 Seeyon Alfons
 Ganapathy Raveendran
 Satha Panahai Ramesh
 Jenisa
 Malarvilly Varatharaja
 Kanthasamy Gangatharan
 Rick Gomes
 David Kinsman
 Megs Mulkins
 Milton
 Clemento Carrillo
 Leslie K.
 Sean Liu
 Ken Kiruba
 Caitlin Alexander
 Murali

Soundtrack

The soundtrack was composed by Senthuran Alagaiya.

References

External links
 Official Website
 Official Facebook Page

2012 films
2010s Tamil-language films
Canadian crime thriller films
2010s Canadian films